Mikhail Malakhov may refer to:
 Mikhail Georgiyevich Malakhov, Russian Arctic explorer, Hero of the Russian Federation
 Mikhail Fedorovich Malakhov (b. 1946), chief justice of the Republic of Kazakhstan from 1993 to 1996
 Mikhail Pavlovich Malakhov (1781-1842), Russian architect